Anna Maria College is a private Roman Catholic college in Paxton, Massachusetts. It was founded in 1946 as a women's college, but has been coeducational since 1973. The school offers both undergraduate and graduate degrees.

History

Anna Maria College was founded in 1946 as a women's college by the Sisters of Saint Anne, after receiving formal approval from Richard Cushing, the Archbishop of Boston. The original campus was in Marlborough, Massachusetts. In 1951, the college moved to its present location in Paxton. Four years later, accreditation by the New England Association of Schools and Colleges was issued.

In 1973, Anna Maria College became coeducational, and a year later, began graduate degree programs. On April 3, 1980, the Sisters of Saint Anne parted ways from running the school, and a Board of Trustees was established.

In 2004, the College established the Molly Bish Center for the Protection of Children and the Elderly.

Academics
Anna Maria College has an average annual enrollment of around 1,500 students, which consist of mostly undergraduate and graduate students, as well as some continuing education learners  Rooted in the traditions of Catholic education, the college combines liberal arts and sciences education with career preparation.

The College is divided among six academic schools: the School of Business; the School of Education; the School of Justice and Social Sciences; the School of Fire and Health Sciences; the School of Visual and Performing Arts; and the School of Humanities.

Athletics

Anna Maria College has thirteen Division III athletic teams, known as the AMCATS, in the National Collegiate Athletic Association (NCAA), including men's baseball, basketball, ice hockey, cross country, football, lacrosse, and soccer; and women's basketball, cross country, field hockey, soccer, softball, tennis, and volleyball. The school is a member of the Great Northeast Athletic Conference (GNAC). Football is played in the Eastern Collegiate Football Conference (ECFC). Anna Maria was also a charter member of the Commonwealth Coast Conference (CCC), which it competed in from 1984 to 2011 before joining the GNAC.

Notable faculty

Craig Blais (English)
Mark Eshbaugh (art)
Thomas Lewis (art)
Brian Mitchell (history)

Notable alumni
 Geraldo Alicea, member of the Massachusetts House of Representatives
 Catherine Cool Rumsey, member of the Rhode Island Senate
 James M. Cummings, sheriff of Barnstable County
 Ed Davis, Police Commissioner of the Boston Police Department
 Brendan Doherty, Superintendent of the Rhode Island State Police
 Shawn Dooley, member of the Massachusetts House of Representatives
 James J. Dwyer, member of the Massachusetts House of Representatives
 William B. Evans, Police Commissioner of the Boston Police Department
 Raymond Hull, member of the Rhode Island House of Representatives
 Brian Patrick Kennedy, member of the Rhode Island House of Representatives
 Lise Thibault (honorary), Lieutenant Governor of Quebec
 Frederica Williams, President of the Whittier Street Health Center
 Steven Xiarhos, member of the Massachusetts House of Representatives

References

External links

 

Anna Maria College
Educational institutions established in 1946
Former women's universities and colleges in the United States
Universities and colleges in Worcester County, Massachusetts
Catholic universities and colleges in Massachusetts
Association of Catholic Colleges and Universities